The Interior Secretary of Pakistan is the Federal Secretary for the Ministry of Interior. As in-charge of the country's law and order machinery, the Interior Secretary is one of the most coveted and sensitive positions in the Government of Pakistan. The position holder is a BPS-22 grade officer, usually belonging to the Pakistan Administrative Service.
 
Notable organisations that come under the control of the Interior Secretary includes the Federal Investigation Agency (FIA), National Database and Registration Authority (NADRA), Directorate General of Immigration & Passports (I&P) and the paramilitary forces namely Frontier Constabulary (FC) and Pakistan Rangers. The administration of the Islamabad Capital Territory is also under the Interior Secretary, as the Chief Commissioner Islamabad directly reports to the Interior Secretary.

List of Interior Secretaries
This table lists down the names of Interior Secretaries that have been in office since January 2001.

See also
Planning and Development Secretary of Pakistan
Finance Secretary of Pakistan
Maritime Secretary of Pakistan
Foreign Secretary of Pakistan
Establishment Secretary of Pakistan
Federal Secretary National Security Division
Aviation Secretary of Pakistan
Commerce Secretary of Pakistan
Defence Secretary of Pakistan

References

External links 
Ministry of Interior

Ministry of Interior (Pakistan)